T. Varagunam, FRCP was a Sri Lankan academic, physician. He was the Chancellor of the Eastern University of Sri Lanka.

References
 http://www.newslanka.net/obituaries.html
 http://www.sundayobserver.lk/2018/02/18/forum/appreciations

External links
Dr. T. Varagunam's Message 
EASTERN UNIVERSITY, SRI LANKA

Alumni of Royal College, Colombo
Chancellors of the Eastern University, Sri Lanka
Sri Lankan Tamil academics
Sri Lankan Tamil physicians
Vidya Jyothi
2018 deaths
1930 births